LeAnna M. Washington (born July 28, 1945) is an American politician from Pennsylvania who served as a Democratic member of the Pennsylvania State Senate for the 4th district from 2005 to 2014.  She served as a member of the Pennsylvania House of Representatives, District 200 from 1993 to 2005. She resigned in 2014 after being charged with a felony for using campaign staff and state resources to plan her birthday party fundraiser.

Early life and education
Washington was born in Philadelphia, Pennsylvania. She graduated from West Philadelphia High School and received a Master of Health Science degree from Lincoln University in 1989.

Washington was a high school dropout, teen parent, and victim of domestic violence early in her marriage.

Career
She worked as District Office Manager for former Pennsylvania Senator Joseph Rocks and as manager of the Philadelphia Parking Authority Employee Assistance Program.

She was elected to the Pennsylvania House of Representatives, District 200 in a special election on November 2, 1993 following the resignation of Gordon J. Linton.

She was elected to represent the 4th senatorial district in the Pennsylvania Senate in a special election held on May 17, 2005.

On March 12, 2014, the Pennsylvania Attorney General's office announced felony charges of diversion of services and conflict of interest against Washington. The charges included usage of staff members and state equipment to plan her birthday party fundraiser.

In October 2014, Washington agreed to leave office early (she had already lost the primary) in exchange for being permitted to retain her retirement benefits. These benefits include lifetime health insurance and a state pension. She agreed to serve three months house arrest, five years of probation, and restitution of $200,000 to the Senate.

References

External links
Pennsylvania State Senate - LeAnna M. Washington official PA Senate website
Senator Washington - official party website

Follow the Money - LeAnna M. Washington
2006 2004 2002 2000 1998 campaign contributions

1945 births
21st-century American women politicians
21st-century American politicians
African-American state legislators in Pennsylvania
African-American women in politics
Lincoln University (Pennsylvania) alumni
Living people
Members of the Pennsylvania House of Representatives
Pennsylvania politicians convicted of crimes
Pennsylvania state senators
Politicians from Philadelphia
Women state legislators in Pennsylvania
20th-century American politicians
20th-century American women politicians
20th-century African-American women
20th-century African-American politicians
21st-century African-American women
21st-century African-American politicians
West Philadelphia High School alumni